E. D. Latta Nurses' Residence is a historic residential building located at Asheville, Buncombe County, North Carolina.  It was built in 1929, and is a three-story, 11 bay, "L"-shaped brick building in the Colonial Revival style.  The central five bays form a slightly projecting pavilion with pediment.  It features a shallow Tuscan order portico at the main entrance.

It was listed on the National Register of Historic Places in 1979.

References

Residential buildings on the National Register of Historic Places in North Carolina
Colonial Revival architecture in North Carolina
Buildings and structures completed in 1929
Buildings and structures in Asheville, North Carolina
National Register of Historic Places in Buncombe County, North Carolina